X-Treme Sports was a Canadian English language category 2 television channel owned by Canwest Media Inc., a division of Canwest Global Communications. X-Treme Sports aired a variety of programming primarily related to extreme sports.

History
On November 24, 2000 Global Television Network Inc., a subsidiary of Canwest, was granted approval by the Canadian Radio-television and Telecommunications Commission (CRTC) to launch a national English-language Category 2 specialty television service called Extreme Sports, described as "featuring the best of "off-beat" sports programming that will give Canadians the opportunity to live vicariously through the ultimate high associated with such extreme pastimes as high altitude sky diving, cliff diving, white water rafting, and mountain climbing."

The channel launched on September 7, 2001 as X-Treme Sports.

Amid the mid-2000s financial crisis and a mounting debt load, Canwest announced in September 2008 that it would be shuttering X-Treme Sports, with an expected closing date of October 9, 2008. Through its official statement, Canwest cited low growth potential as the reason for its closing of the service, noting funds would be better directed to other channels with greater growth potential. The channel later closed on October 9 as expected.

In December 2010, Leonard Asper, the former CEO of Canwest by that point after the assets were sold to Postmedia and Shaw, acquired Fight Network through his Syngus Corp. holding company via its Anthem Media Group marking the return of sports television ownership.

Programming
Programming on X-Treme Sports primarily focused on extreme sports series, including men's and women's competitions, lifestyle, and reality programs. Series primarily focused on the sports within the firm definition of extreme sports, such as motocross, mountain biking, surfing, skateboarding, and snowboarding; however, other forms of extreme, adventure and thrill-seeking sports/activities included MMA, professional wrestling, and slamball.

The following list is a sampling of series aired during its last year of operation:

 360 Surfing
 Crash Bang Wallop
 Crash Stunt Idiots
 Extreme Championship Wrestling
 Fear Factor
 Fusion TV
 IFL Battleground
 IFL Fight Night
 MMX Treme
 Ouch: That Had To Hurt
 Ride Guide Bike 
 World of Wakeboarding
 X-Sport

References

Sports television networks in Canada
Television channels and stations established in 2001
Defunct television networks in Canada
Television channels and stations disestablished in 2008
Former Corus Entertainment networks